Vicki Mackenzie (born 1947), an author and journalist, was born in England and spent much of her early life in Australia. The daughter of a naval officer, she graduated from Queensland University and became a reporter at the Sun newspaper in Sydney. 

Later she moved on to London where she worked as a features writer on the Daily Sketch and the Daily Mail. She went on to write for the Sunday Times, The Observer, the Daily Telegraph, the Sunday Telegraph, the Daily Express, the Mail on Sunday and many national magazines.

Buddhism
Since taking a month-long meditation course in Nepal in 1976, her primary interest has been to make the profundity of Buddhist philosophy accessible to the general public. Her books on Buddhism and reincarnation include:
Reincarnation: the Boy Lama
Reborn in the West: the Reincarnation Masters, Da Capo Press, 1996, 
Cave in the Snow: a Western woman's quest for enlightenment, 1999,  (a biography of Tenzin Palmo, also about Freda Bedi)
Why Buddhism?: Westerners in search of wisdom 
Child of Tibet (co-authored with Soname Yangchen), 2006
The Revolutionary Life of Freda Bedi: British Feminist, Indian Nationalist, Buddhist Nun, 2017

She was interviewed by the Radio National program The Spirit of Things in 2002 about her book, Why Buddhism? Westerners in Search of Wisdom. Her book Cave in the Snow: a woman's quest for enlightenment was reviewed in Minneapolis City Pages.

See also
Tenzin Palmo
Lama Osel
Lama Yeshe
Tibetan Buddhism

References

External links
Cave in the Snow: A Woman's Quest for Enlightenment
Reincarnation: The Boy Lama
Reborn in the West: The Reincarnation Masters
Why Buddhism? Westerners in Search of Wisdom

1947 births
Living people
Buddhist writers
British journalists
Female Buddhist spiritual teachers